Garry Lorne Peters (born October 9, 1942) is a Canadian former professional ice hockey centre and head coach who played in the National Hockey League (NHL) for the Montreal Canadiens, New York Rangers, Philadelphia Flyers and Boston Bruins. He also played in the World Hockey Association (WHA) for the New York Raiders and New York Golden Blades/Jersey Knights.

Career statistics

Regular season and playoffs

Coaching career

Awards
1963–64 — CPHL Rookie of the Year
1971–72 — Les Cunningham Award

External links
 

1942 births
Living people
Boston Braves (AHL) players
Boston Bruins players
Canadian expatriate ice hockey players in the United States
Canadian ice hockey centres
Estevan Bruins players
Houston Apollos players
Hull-Ottawa Canadiens players
Ice hockey people from Saskatchewan
Montreal Canadiens players
New York Golden Blades players
New York Raiders players
New York Rangers players
North American Hockey League (1973–1977) coaches
Omaha Knights (CHL) players
Philadelphia Flyers players
Quebec Aces (AHL) players
Regina Pats players
Sportspeople from Regina, Saskatchewan